Lucas Augusto Silva Gomes (born 16 June 1995) is a Brazilian footballer who plays as a forward.

Career statistics

Club

Notes

References

1995 births
Living people
Brazilian footballers
Brazilian expatriate footballers
Association football forwards
Kategoria e Parë players
União São João Esporte Clube players
Clube Atlético Votuporanguense players
KS Egnatia Rrogozhinë players
Brazilian expatriate sportspeople in Albania
Expatriate footballers in Albania
Sportspeople from Londrina
21st-century Brazilian people